Night Music is the 12th studio album by Joe Jackson, released in 1994 on Virgin Records. The album did not chart. Soon after the album's release, Jackson moved to the Sony Classical label.

Track listing 
All songs written and arranged by Joe Jackson.

Personnel 
 Musicians
 Joe Jackson - piano, electric piano, organ, various synthesizers and samplers, celeste, accordion, tom-toms, bells, vibraphone, cymbals, Salvation Army bass drum and vocals
 Mary Rowell - viola on "Nocturne No. 1", "The Man Who Wrote Danny Boy", "Only The Future" and "Nocturne No. 4", Violin on "Nocturne No. 4"
 Jean Laurendeau - Ondes Martenot on "Nocturne No. 1" and "Sea of Secrets"
 Taylor Carpenter - special guest vocalist on "Ever After"
 Michael Morreale - trumpet on "Ever After"
 Gary Burke - drums on "Ever After"
 Máire Brennan - special guest vocalist on "The Man Who Wrote Danny Boy"
 Dick Morgan - oboe on "Nocturne No. 3" and "Sea of Secrets"
 Renée Fleming - special guest vocalist on "Lullaby"
 Albert Regni - clarinet and bass clarinet on "Lullaby"
 Graham Maby - bass guitar on "Only The Future"
 Tony Aiello - flute on "Only The Future"
 Mary Wootton - cello on "Nocturne No. 4"

 Production
 Joe Jackson - arrangements, producer, sequencing
 Ed Roynesdal - co-producer, recording engineer, sampling
 Andi Grassi, Ken Thomas, Carl Glanville  - recording engineer
 Ted Jensen - mastering engineer
 Len Peltier - art direction
 Robert Flynt - photography

Covers 
 Alice Lee covered "Sea Of Secrets" on the 2004 album Different for Girls: Women Artists and Female-Fronted Bands Cover Joe Jackson.

References

External links 
 Night Music album information at The Joe Jackson Archive

1994 albums
Joe Jackson (musician) albums
Virgin Records albums